Berl Eastman Priebe (May 31, 1918 – July 20, 2014) was an American farmer and politician.

Born near Lone Rock, Iowa, Priebe was a farmer and livestock dealer. He served in the Iowa House of Representatives in 1968 as a Democrat and then in the Iowa State Senate. He died in Algona, Iowa.

Notes

1918 births
2014 deaths
People from Kossuth County, Iowa
Democratic Party members of the Iowa House of Representatives
Democratic Party Iowa state senators
20th-century American politicians
Farmers from Iowa